Per un figlio (පුතෙකුට) is a film by Suranga Deshapriya Katugampala, an Italian citizen of Sri Lankan (Ceylonese) origin. It is set in northern Italy, and portrays the relationship between an immigrant Sri Lankan mother and her adolescent  and partially-acculturated son. It thus explores issues of multiculturalism and of small marginalised communities. The principal rôle is played by Kaushalya Fernando. In November 2016 it was presented at the Tallinn Black Nights Film Festival in Estonia.

References

Italian drama films
2016 films
2010s Italian films